Kleczew  is a town in Konin County, Greater Poland Voivodeship, western-central Poland.

External links
kleczew.pl

Cities and towns in Greater Poland Voivodeship
Konin County